Ecoregions of the world, spanning all land area (terrestrial) of the planet, were first defined and mapped in 2001 and subsequently revised in 2017. Later, freshwater ecoregions and marine ecoregions of the world were identified. Within India, there are 46 terrestrial ecoregions, 14 freshwater ecoregions, and 6 marine ecoregions.

Terrestrial ecoregions
The terrestrial ecoregions of the world include 45 ecoregions that fall entirely or partly within the boundaries of India. These ecoregions fall within two biogeographic realms: Indomalayan and Palearctic. They also fall under ten biomes: Deserts and Xeric Shrublands,  Flooded Grasslands and Savannas, Mangroves, Montane Grasslands and Shrublands, Temperate Broadleaf and Mixed Forests, Temperate Conifer Forests, Tropical and Subtropical Coniferous Forests, Tropical and Subtropical Dry  Broadleaf Forests, Tropical and Subtropical Grasslands, Savannas and Shrublands, and Tropical and Subtropical Moist Broadleaf Forests. The ecoregion Rock and Ice is not included under any specific biome or biogeographic realm.

Freshwater ecoregions
Freshwater ecoregions of the world have been defined as "a large area encompassing one or more freshwater systems with a distinct assemblage of natural freshwater communities and species. The freshwater species, dynamics, and environmental conditions within a given ecoregion are more similar to each other than to those of surrounding ecoregions, and together form a conservation unit." The following 14 freshwater ecoregions occur within India.
 Upper Indus
 Indus Himalayan Foothills
 Lower and Middle Indus
 Ganges Himalayan Foothills
 Middle Brahmaputra
 Chin Hills–Arakan Coast
 Ganges Delta and Plain
 Narmada–Tapti
 Northern Deccan Plateau
 Southern Deccan Plateau
 Southeastern Ghats
 Western Ghats
 Andaman Islands
 Nicobar Islands

Marine ecoregions
Marine ecoregions of the world have been described across the worlds oceans and seas. India's seas are in the Western Indo-Pacific marine realm. This includes the following four provinces and six marine ecoregions. 
 West and South Indian Shelf province
 Western India
 South India and Sri Lanka
 Central Indian Ocean Islands province
 Maldives
 Bay of Bengal province
 Eastern India
 Northern Bay of Bengal
 Andaman province
 Andaman and Nicobar Islands

Global 200 ecoregions in India 

The following are the ecoregions in India that are included in the Global 200 ecoregions:

Terrestrial 
 Chota Nagpur dry deciduous forests (India)
 Eastern Deccan Plateau moist forests (old name) or East Deccan moist deciduous forests (current name) (India)
 Eastern Himalayan alpine meadows (Bhutan, China, India, Myanmar, Nepal)
 Eastern Himalayan broadleaf forests (Bhutan, China, India, Myanmar, Nepal)
 Himalayan subtropical pine forests (Bhutan, India, Nepal, Pakistan)
 Naga-Manipuri-Chin hills moist forests (India)
 Northeast India-Myanmar pine forests (India, Myanmar)
 Rann of Kutch seasonal salt marsh (India, Pakistan)
 South Western Ghats moist deciduous forests (India)
 Sundarbans mangroves (Bangladesh, India)
 Terai-Duar savannas and grasslands (Bhutan, India, Nepal)
 Tibetan Plateau alpine shrublands and meadows (Afghanistan, China, India, Pakistan, Tajikistan)
 Western Himalayan broadleaf forests (Afghanistan, India, Nepal, Pakistan)

See also  
 Arid Forest Research Institute (AFRI)

External links 
 Ecozones of India
 An article about India's biodiversity
 Seasons, climate, global warming in India

References

 
Ecoregions
India
ecoregions